Corvo Attano is a fictional character of Arkane Studios' Dishonored series. He is the lead protagonist in Dishonored, one of two playable protagonists in Dishonored 2, and has appeared in multiple Dishonored works, including a comic series, and the first published book of a trilogy of novels announced in 2016.

Fictional character biography
Corvo was born on 25th Day, Month of Nets, 1798 in Karnaca, Serkonos to a lower-class family. His father was killed in a logging accident while Corvo was young. He became estranged from his sister Beatrici, and mother who died, as revealed in the second and third editions of the comics, before Corvo left his birthplace to travel to Dunwall.

At the age of 16 he won a fighting tournament, the Blade Verbena, for which he was awarded a military rank as officer.

At the beginning of the first game, the player is introduced to Corvo serving as a body guard, known as Lord Protector, for the character, Jessamine, who is Empress of the game's fictional monarchy. When the empress is assassinated, Corvo is blamed for her murder, making him ostensibly, the first Royal Protector in history to do so. He is imprisoned and tortured for six months, before escaping. The plot of the game proceeds with Corvo a "wanted exile, hunted by those who arranged the regicide".

Throughout the plot, it is implied that Corvo previously had a private intimate relationship with Jessamine, and that he was the father of Jessamine's daughter, Emily Kaldwin. This is later confirmed in the second game, and expounded upon in the intergame comic series and novel.

As the second game progresses, Corvo and his daughter are confronted by Jessamine's purported half-sister, Delilah, who serves as the game's main antagonist.

Development
The early development of the character was based on 17th century London attire, and was similar in appearance to that of the character Garrett from the game series Thief. The original concept was abandoned as the universe developed into its eventual form, described as "whalepunk".

Dishonored

The character of Corvo develops throughout the first game based largely on the decisions made throughout, with Emily reacting to Corvo's moral decisions through her drawings. According to Harvey Smith:

It is possible, through decisions made by players through the game, to arrive at multiple possible endings. However, subsequent publications leading to the setting of the second game, revealed the most extreme possible "high chaos" ending was not considered canon by the developers. Regarding canon, Smith said "we tend to pick elements that we like as canon".

The Dunwall Archives
Corvo appears repeatedly in the graphic novel Dishonored: The Dunwall Archives, released by Dark Horse Comics. This includes multiple entries in the book's opening timeline, an excerpt from the historical record of government positions and ranks, and a reproduction of his wanted poster, advertising a reward of 30,000 coins, and decrying that "the offenses of this man are high crimes under the laws of the City Watch of Dunwall and the edicts of our brave Lord Regent in these times of peril".

According to the timeline provided in the book, Corvo is named Royal Protector on the 7th Day of the Month of Songs, 1817 at the age of 19, and six years later, the two become lovers on the 2nd of Rain, 1823. Corvo is then marked by the outsider following Jessamine's death in the year 1837, making the character aged 39 at the beginning of the first game.

The Wyrmwood Deceit
Corvo serves the leading role in a comic mini-series by Gordon Rennie and Andrea Olimpieri, entitled Dishonored: The Wyrmwood Deceit, released August 3 through October 19, 2016. The full set was also released as a graphic novel collection on November 29 of the same year. The series is set twelve years after the conclusion of the events of the first game, and centers on his attempts to find an apprentice to serve as his heir.

The series opens showing Corvo involved in the selection and training of the city guard, while serving in his official capacity. He then encounters city watch officer Martha Cottings, who he considers a potential candidate to be his heir. In an ensuing battle with gang members, he discovers that a locket belonging to a boy member of the gang, contains a picture of his estranged sister. This leads Corvo on his central mission of the series of investigating the nature of the picture.

The series explores Corvo's personality more deeply through the use of thought captions. The first issue received an overall rating of 7.5 from CGMagazine.

The Corroded Man
In the game-inspired book by Adam Christopher, Dishonored: The Corroded Man, Corvo trains and fights alongside his daughter Emily, when an escaped prisoner reforms the Whalers gang, originally responsible for the assassination of the Empress. In writing the novel, Christopher coordinated with writers of the games, to ensure continuity of the canon.

Corroded Man confirmed the low chaos outcome of the first game as canon. It also addressed multiple intermediate decisions where Corvo favored non-lethal decision making. Waverly Boyle, one of three possible randomized targets for Corvo during the first game, is cemented as the canon objective. Corvo in fact chose to have her kidnapped, and all three sisters survive the mission. The character Slackjaw, appearing in the book, reveals that the character was rescued by the canon Corvo, who consequently, made the decision to kill his captor, Granny Rags. Similarly, Geoff Curnow, who appears in the book, must necessarily have been saved by Corvo in the game.

NZ Gamer praised the novel, saying "as a standalone novel, The Corroded Man is good. Compared to other gaming related novels, it's truly excellent".

Dishonored 2

In the second game, where Corvo is one of two playable characters, he appears 15 years older than at the conclusion of the first, and the story progresses with the other playable character, Emily Kaldwin, his daughter, having now grown into adulthood. Corvo now serves as Emily's Royal Protector and Spymaster. As creative director Harvey Smith addressed the dilemma posed by the interaction between the two, saying Corvo was "wondering how long he can keep protecting his daughter ... He knows that someday somebody's going to come for her, because she's the Empress, and she needs to be able to stand on her own".

During initial development of Dishonored 2, the sole protagonist was planned to be only Emily, but the decision was made to include Corvo due to the nostalgia the development team had for the character. In this second game, some, such as Fox News have observed Corvo is designed to favor a play style involving stealth and evasion in comparison to the abilities of Emily. Other's have disagreed, such as James Davenport, writing for PC Gamer, saying "it's not like Emily is The Stealth Character and Corvo is The Maniac" but adding that players should prefer Corvo who favor a play style of plotting precise movements, managing smaller groups of enemies, who would "rather hide in a corpse than clean your room", and "want to see the silent protagonist made into a troubled, loving human".

Speaking of the development of the character in the second game, and the decision to fully voice the character, creative director Harvey Smith said:

Writing of the visual updates to Corvo for the second game, developer Sergey Kolesov commented: "Our main focus was on tailoring a new costume that fits his position in society but also reflects the assassin he becomes once more when the game starts".

Reception
The character of Corvo Attano received critical acclaim. In 2013, Complex rated Corvo number thirty among "The 50 Most Badass Video Game Characters Of All Time". TGN named him sixth on their list of all-time best video game assassins, calling him a "perfect mix of silence and aggression", while Tim Horton of Creative.co, and senior writer for Now Loading, named him seventh in his same list for Movie Pilot.

In their book, The Dark Side of Game Play, Mortensen, Linderoth, and Brown examine Corvo and his in-game actions as a motif revolving around vengeance. As they phrase the moral delimma posed by the character's actions: "Virtuous Corvo would not pursue personally motivated revenge but might find his actions justified due to the offenses committed". They continue, emphasizing that vengeance is, "connected to a dark emotion because it is associated with a negative and often powerful sensation about wanting and believing that retaliation will make up for the injustice caused".

Robert Rath, writing for The Escapist, saw Corvo as a man tested and tempted by a demonic figure (the Outsider). Corvo is provided by the Outsider the tools and, with the Heart, the justifications for killing, with the gameplay incentivizing taking a more violent approach. Rath sees a low chaos Corvo as "a good man who holds onto his morals as the world beats him down", in contrast to the higher chaos Corvo who gives into his "baser instincts".

In another article Rath, with contributions by Dr. Stephen Banks of the University of Reading, looked at Corvo's actions through the lens of British 18th and 19th century honor culture. They note that Corvo, despite being former Lord Protector, and the truth of his ousting being fully believed by Loyalist, is nonetheless referred to by first name even by servants, and in many ways treated like a servant, sent to run errands. His social status as an outcast was useful to the Loyalists initially. They continue: "Corvo does all the tasks the blue bloods of the Loyalist Conspiracy are unable to perform because it might sully their reputations". Finally they conclude that:

Voicing
Unlike other characters in the first game, Corvo remains silent during all conversations. Corvo was left deliberately "blank", allowing the player to decide on his motivations depending on their playstyle. During alpha, the developers experimented with giving the player some text input options, though this was not developed further.

According to co-creators Raphael Colantonio and Harvey Smith, the choice to omit dialogue, in the original incarnation, was an attempt to allow players to develop his personality through their own actions, and avoid incorporating elements into dialogue which may conflict with those choices: "If we portrayed Corvo angry and seeking revenge, it might offend the non-lethal player who is seeking a stable outcome for Dunwall and vice versa".

PC Gamer, comparing Corvo to the silent protagonist of the Half-Life series, Gordon Freeman, quoted Arkane writer Austin Grossman, saying:

This motif is abandoned in media published following the first game, first through the use of thought captions in the comics, and culminated in Dishonored 2 where he was fully voiced by actor Stephen Russell, in a performance described as gruff. According to Harvey Smith, the choice to voice the character lent a "different theme in the narrative sense, in the literary sense ... Corvo's an older guy, he's coming home for the first time to Serkonos. Emily is like an empress outlaw on the run, and she's young, she's 25. So their perspectives are very different".

Abilities
Along with the use of various weapons, Corvo gains access to special abilities, dubbed "a delight for fans of the macabre" by The Washington Times. These allow the player greater freedom in navigating the games' objectives, and play central roles in the stories of the book and comic series. His abilities are granted to him through his interaction with the character The Outsider, described in-game as "a figure of myth, neither good nor evil". Corvo's abilities introduced in the initial game, are continued through and expanded upon in the sequel. According to lead designer Binga Bakaba, "Corvo comes back with all of his powers ... and what we wanted to do is not only put them in the new engine, but also find interesting tweaks or improvements to them".

 Blink - In the first game blink initially allows players to teleport a short distance, and can be subsequently upgraded to allow travel over greater distances. In the expansion, Knife of Dunwall, a modification was introduced for the ability as used by the character Daud, allowing players to freeze time. Dishonored 2 introduced additional mechanics allowing players to use the teleportation momentum as an attack, and to assassinate enemies through windows or over ledges. PC Gamer cited the ability blink as the inspiration behind similar abilities in the games Destiny and Deus Ex.
 Dark Vision - Dark vision initially allows players to see enemies through solid objects, and can be upgraded to reveal items. The sequel introduced additional mechanics. The upgrade Greater Dark Vision provides vision of objects and security systems, while the upgrade Premonition provides vision of the routes of non-player characters. In 2016 the satirical website, Point and Click Bait published a story claiming a class action lawsuit had been filed in the Supreme Court of Dunwall, alleging overexposure to Dark Vision had given game characters cancer.
 Devouring Swarm - The devouring swarm ability summons rats which attack enemies and devour their bodies. This ability interacts with an overarching mechanic in the game, wherein, as the player progresses through the story, corpses left behind encourage deleterious infestations of insects throughout the game world. Upgrades available in Dishonored 2 allow for greater swarms, swarms that follow the player, and the ability to summon two swarms simultaneously.
 Possession – With the use of this ability Corvo may possess other characters in the games, including animals and other humans, as well dead bodies, each unlocked in successive upgrades. Additional modifications allow players to increase the maximum duration of the ability, and possess multiple characters in sequence.
 Bend Time allows players to manipulate the passage of in-game time, stopping or slowing it. Alterations lend greater longevity to its use, and greater movement for its duration. Writing for Forbes, Paul Tassi described Bend Time as "the most fun you can have", and a principal reason to prefer Corvo as protagonist.

Mask
Throughout Corvo's appearances he wears a mask to hide his identity for, as he himself phrased it in the third edition of the comic series, "certain work that needed done". It also provides telescopic sight. In the fictional universe, it is designed by the inventor Piero Joplin, after a dream in which he sees "death itself", as revealed in the final short film in the Tales from Dunwall series. For the development of the second game, the material of the mask was updated to be sewn metal, and to fit more closely.

In 2013 Technically Magic Effects used the in-game model for the mask to develop a 3-D printed replica for competition, and in 2016 the collectors edition of Dishonored 2 included a 13.5 inch replica. Polygon and IGN described it as "iconic", and in 2013, Game Informer named Corvo's mask as number four on their list of creepiest video game masks. In their examination of beloved but unrecognized characters, Games Radar observed: "The mask basically becomes his face, to the point that almost all the game's promotional material features it. In his world, it is the face of Death".

The mask was the inspiration behind the "Lacking Moral Fiber" purchasable hat in the game Team Fortress 2.

Notes

References

External links

Action-adventure game characters
Fictional assassins in video games
Bethesda characters
Dishonored (series)
Fictional bodyguards in video games
Fictional prison escapees
Fictional swordfighters in video games
Male characters in video games
Microsoft protagonists
Shapeshifter characters in video games
Silent protagonists
Video game characters introduced in 2012
Video game characters who have mental powers
Video game characters who use magic
Vigilante characters in video games